Mako Kamitsuna (Houston, Texas) is an American Film director, editor, and writer, raised in Hiroshima, Japan. She studied Philosophy at Columbia University. In 2016, she received with John Maringouin the Special Jury Award of the Sundance Film Festival in the Best Editing category by We Are X. Kamitsuna has been invited to the Oscars.

Filmography 

 The Lull Breaker (Short, 2013). Director and writer.
 She, Who Excels in Solitude (Short, 2013). Director and writer.
 Katya (Short, 2011). Director and writer.
 Betty Anderson (Short, 2000). Director and writer.
 We Are X (2016). Editor
 Blackhat (2015). Editor.

References 

Living people
American film directors
People from Houston
Columbia University alumni
Year of birth missing (living people)